Al Ahli Tripoli Sports Club, also known as Al Ahli Tripoli, is a Libyan football club based in Tripoli, Libya. It is the most successful Libyan club in history , having won 12 Libyan Premier League titles, 6 Libyan Cups and 2 Libyan Super Cups.

The club's crest consists of a green and white background, with a torch placed on an outline of Libya. The torch is meant to signify independence for the nation, as it was achieved just months after the club was founded. The club's crest changed after it won its 10th Libyan Premier League title in 2000, with a star being placed on top.

The club won the first national championship in the 1967–68 season, but then suffered a period of seven years until its next win in 1970–71. The club won two of the next three titles, and picked up the last before the cancellation of the league in 1977–78. The 1980s were a very dire period for the club, as their own failure, this meant that their rivals went into the 1990s with six titles to their own five. However, they reached the final of the African Cup Winners' Cup in 1984, where they withdrew from facing Al-Ahly Cairo, as the bad Libyan relationship with Egypt at that time meant that Libyan clubs were banned from facing Egyptian clubs.

Foundation
In the middle of the 20th century, Libya, a country still looking for its independence, started to found many sporting and youth clubs in a political move to unite the country and drive out the British forces. A group of youngsters from Tripoli decided to name their club Al Istiqlal, meaning Independence, but the British administration, uncomfortable with this name as it may have caused a revolt against their power, refused it. The club was therefore named Al-Ahly, meant as The People's, and chose the club's colours as green to signify independence, peace and hope for the country. The youngsters who put their names down for the first board meeting were:

Musbah Wanis (President and owner)
Alaa Musbah Wanis (Vice-president)
Yousef Bin Abdallah (Treasurer)
Salem Bin Hussein (Board member)
Mustafa Al Raqea'y (Board member)
Mahmoud Bin Hadimah (Board member)
Mohamed Sa'ad Bin Othman (Board member)
Mustapha Al Khouga (Board member)

The club was founded on 19 September 1950.

First ever squad 

Amir Al Mujraab
Mabrouk Al Misraty
Ahmed Al Taweel
Hassan Mohamed Al Amir
Mahmoud Abu Hadima
Mohamed Al Houny
Mohamed Al Yumni
Salem Bin Hussein
Mustafa Al Khouga

Al-hadi Al Khadaar
Mustafa Al Raqea'y
Mohamed Al Sadiq Abu Raqiqa
Ali Al Jundi
Abdesalam Bizaan
Ibrahim Kafaalah
Yousef Bin Abdallah Al Fazzani
Ali Al Jdeady
Manager: Othman Bizaan

Crest history

Honours
Libyan Premier League: 12
Champions 1963–64, 1970–71, 1972–73, 1973–74, 1977–78, 1983–84, 1992–93, 1993–94, 1994–95, 2000, 2013–14, 2015–16
First official tournament in the Libyan Premier League season 1963–64 winners
First cup in the Libyan Premier League Season 1976
The first team in Libya to get the Gold Star (10 Championships)
Libyan Cup: 6
Winners 1976, 1994, 2000, 2001, 2006, 2016
Libyan Super Cup: 2 
Winners 2000, 2017

Performance in CAF competitions
CAF Champions League: 5 appearances
2000 – First Round
2009 – Second Round 
2015 – Preliminary Round
2016 – Second Round
2017 – Quarter-finals
 African Cup of Champions Clubs: 3 appearances
First Round 1981
First round 1983
Quarter-finals 1972
CAF Cup Winners' Cup: 2 appearances
Semi finals (withdrew from final) : 1984
Second Round : 2002
CAF Confederation Cup: 5 appearances
Premliminary Round 2007
Intermediate Round 2009
First Round 2010
Premliminary Round 2014
Group stage 2016 (Top 8)
Semi Final 2022

Sponsorship

Official Sponsor
Al-Madar Al-Jadid Telecomm and Eni are the official Sponsors for Al-Ahli
US Steel GT is the current Sponsors for Al-Ahli

Kit providers
Former kit providers of Al Ahli were Adidas and Diadora.
Current kit provider is Adidas.

Players
Libyan teams are limited to three players without North African citizenship.

Current squad

Managers
 Piet Hamberg (2000)
 Theo Bücker (2007–08)
 Yuriy Sevastyanenko (2008)
 Noureddine Saâdi (2008–09)
   Hossam El-Badry (2013)
   Talaat Youssef (2014)
 Ruud Krol (2014)
 Jamal Abu Nawara (2016)
 Tarek El-Ashry (2016)
   Talaat Youssef (2017)
  Reda Atia (2018)
  Tariq Thabit (2019)
  Talaat Youssef (2021)
  Fathi Jabal (2022)
  Tarek Jaraea (2023)

References

Football clubs in Libya
Association football clubs established in 1950
Sport in Tripoli, Libya
1950 establishments in Libya